Camille Grassineau (born 10 September 1990) is a French rugby union player. She represented  at the 2014 Women's Rugby World Cup. She was a member of the squad that won their fourth Six Nations title in 2014.

Grassineau was also a member of the French squad to the 2013 Rugby World Cup Sevens She was selected as a member of the France women's national rugby sevens team to the 2016 Summer Olympics.  She was the first woman to score a tri in the olympics since rugby returned to the games. 

Grassineau won a bronze medal at the 2022 Rugby World Cup Sevens.

References

External links
 
 
 
 

People from Bergerac, Dordogne
1990 births
Living people
French female rugby union players
Female rugby sevens players
Place of birth missing (living people)
Rugby sevens players at the 2016 Summer Olympics
Olympic rugby sevens players of France
France international rugby sevens players
Sportspeople from Dordogne
Rugby sevens players at the 2020 Summer Olympics
Medalists at the 2020 Summer Olympics
Olympic silver medalists for France
Olympic medalists in rugby sevens
France international women's rugby sevens players